Split is a 2016 American psychological thriller film written, directed and produced by M. Night Shyamalan, and starring James McAvoy, Anya Taylor-Joy, and Betty Buckley. The film follows a man with dissociative identity disorder who kidnaps and imprisons three teenage girls in an isolated underground facility.

Principal photography began on November 11, 2015, in Philadelphia, Pennsylvania. The film premiered at Fantastic Fest on September 26, 2016, and was released in the United States on January 20, 2017, by Universal Pictures. It received generally positive reviews; critics highly praised McAvoy's performance, and welcomed Shyamalan's direction. Some mental health advocates criticized the film for its stigmatization of mental illness. Split was a commercial success, grossing $278 million worldwide on a budget of $9 million.

Split is a standalone sequel to Shyamalan's 2000 film Unbreakable although not marketed as such, instead saving the revelation for a scene featuring Bruce Willis reprising his Unbreakable role in an uncredited cameo. Commentators dubbed Split the first-ever "stealth sequel", and the first solo supervillain origin film. The 2019 film Glass, which combined the casts and characters of both previous films, concluded Shyamalan's Unbreakable trilogy.

Plot 
Kevin Wendell Crumb, a man struggling with dissociative identity disorder (DID) rooted in his history of childhood abuse and abandonment, has been managing living with his 23 distinct personalities well for several years with help from his therapist, Dr. Karen Fletcher. The most dominant of the desirable alters, "Barry," has been in control of deciding which personalities get to control Kevin's body, and lately he has not allowed "Dennis" or "Patricia" to have a turn due to the former's tendency to harass young girls and the latter's belief in a mysterious entity called "The Beast" who plans to rid the world of the "impure," that is, those who have not suffered. Dr. Fletcher is concerned when she realizes that "Dennis" has been impersonating "Barry" during their sessions after questioning him about an incident wherein Dennis had been left disturbed when two teenage girls had placed his hands on their breasts while drunk.

Just outside Philadelphia, Dennis kidnaps three girls — Claire, Casey and Marcia — when they are waiting in the car of Claire's father to get driven home from a birthday party. He imprisons the girls in a secret underground lair beneath the Philadelphia Zoo, where they meet Patricia, who protects the girls from Dennis to save them for "The Beast," and a 9-year-old boy alter named "Hedwig," revealed to be the true dominant alter, whom Patricia and Dennis are manipulating to shut out the other alters. The girls try to escape by going through the vents, manipulating Kevin's alters, and communicating with another individual via a walkie-talkie, but all of their attempts end in failure.

Dr. Fletcher goes to the zoo to talk to Dennis when he claims to have made contact with "The Beast," in reality a yet-to-manifest 24th personality, but she discovers Claire, so Dennis incapacitates the doctor and locks her up. Then he goes to the train station and boards an empty train car, where "The Beast" takes over. "The Beast," who displays enhanced strength and animalistic tendencies, returns to his lair, thanks Dr. Fletcher for her help, and crushes her to death. He savagely feeds upon and kills Claire and Marcia before approaching Casey, but she calls out Kevin's full name, which brings forth his original personality. Upon learning of the situation and realizing that he has not been in control of his own body for two years, the horrified Kevin begs Casey to kill him with a shotgun he has hidden. This prompts all 24 personalities to fight for control, with Patricia the victor. She tells Casey that "Kevin" has been made to sleep far away and will not awaken now even if his name is called.

While Patricia returns control to "The Beast," Casey retrieves the shotgun and a box of cartridges and escapes into a tunnel. She manages to shoot "The Beast" twice before running out of ammo, but he only sustains minor wounds. He moves closer to murder her, but stops when he sees scars across her abdomen and chest, which are related to her having been abused by her uncle and legal guardian, John, both before and after her father's death. Because she is "pure," "The Beast" spares Casey's life, and she is rescued the next morning by the police.

In another hideout, Dennis, Patricia, and Hedwig discuss the power of "The Beast" and their plans to change the world. At the Silk City Diner, several patrons watch a news report on "The Beast's" crimes, with the correspondent mentioning that his numerous alters have earned him the nickname "The Horde." A waitress notes the similarity to a criminal in a wheelchair who was incarcerated fifteen years earlier, who was also given a nickname. As she tries to remember it, the man sitting next to her replies that it was "Mr. Glass".

Cast 
 James McAvoy as Kevin Wendell Crumb / Dennis / Patricia / Hedwig / Barry / Orwell / Jade / The Beast: Kevin struggles to live with dissociative identity disorder (DID), which has developed to the point that he has 23 distinct personalities. They are so distinct that each is unaware of what happens when the others are in "the light" and they each have a unique body chemistry (Jade, for instance, is diabetic). A 24th personality, "The Beast", manifests as a grotesque sociopath and insatiable cannibal with superhuman capabilities, such as inhuman bodily strength, enhanced speed and agility, and near-invulnerability. "The Beast" can even scale walls and stick to ceilings.
 Anya Taylor-Joy as Casey Cooke, a teenage girl with a traumatic past and a history of self-harm who is kidnapped by "Dennis", one of Kevin's personalities, to be sacrificed to "The Beast".
 Izzie Coffey as 5-year-old Casey
 Betty Buckley as Karen Fletcher, a psychologist who attempts to help Kevin with his DID and to get the scientific community to recognize the extent to which DID can cause physiological changes.
 Haley Lu Richardson as Claire Benoit, a classmate of Casey and a friend of Marcia who is also kidnapped by "Dennis" to be sacrificed to "The Beast".
 Jessica Sula as Marcia, a classmate of Casey and a friend of Claire who is also kidnapped by "Dennis" to be sacrificed to "The Beast".
 Sebastian Arcelus as Casey's father.
 Brad William Henke as John Cooke, Casey's paternal uncle.
 Neal Huff as Mr. Benoit, Claire's father.
 Lyne Renée as academic moderator.
 M. Night Shyamalan as Jai, a security guard in Dr. Fletcher's apartment building.
 Rosemary Howard as Penelope Crumb, Kevin's mother.
 Bruce Willis as David Dunn (uncredited cameo)
 Kim Director as Hannah (uncredited; scenes deleted)
 Sterling K. Brown as Shaw (uncredited; scenes deleted)

Production 
Shyamalan conceived the idea for Split years before he wrote the screenplay. He explained, "In this case, I had written the character a while ago, and I had written out a few scenes of it, so I even had dialogue written out, which is really unusual for me. It sat there for a long time, and I really don't have a clear reason why I didn't pull the trigger earlier. But this felt like the perfect time to do it, with the type of movies I'm doing now, and the type of tones I am interested in – humor and suspense."

On October 2, 2015, James McAvoy was cast in the film to play the lead, replacing Joaquin Phoenix. On October 12, 2015, Anya Taylor-Joy, Betty Buckley, Jessica Sula, and Haley Lu Richardson were added to the cast. On October 27, 2015, Universal Pictures came on board to release the film and titled it as Split.

The character of Kevin had been in one of the early drafts of Shyamalan's Unbreakable, but he had pulled the character out, stating there were balancing issues at that time. With Split, he brought in some of the scenes he had written for Unbreakable around Kevin. The film ends with the appearance of Bruce Willis's character, David Dunn, from Unbreakable, who makes a comment in reference to the previous film, placing Unbreakable and Split within the same narrative universe. Shyamalan requested permission to incorporate the character from Walt Disney Studios, which had produced Unbreakable. Shyamalan met with Sean Bailey about the use of the character; they came to a gentlemen's agreement where Bailey agreed to allow the use of the character in the film without a fee and Shyamalan promised that Disney would be involved in a sequel if developed. Shyamalan was very secretive of Willis' involvement in Split, removing the final scene from the film for test audiences. The cameo was shown at the 2016 Fantastic Fest and 2016 AFI Fest months before its theatrical release.

As with The Visit, Shyamalan funded the film himself. Principal photography on the film began on November 11, 2015, in Philadelphia, Pennsylvania. Reshoots occurred in June 2016. During post-production, Sterling K. Brown's role as Shaw, Dr. Fletcher's neighbor, was cut from the film, as Shyamalan felt that his scenes were ultimately unnecessary. McAvoy broke his hand in a scene where he was supposed to punch a metal door, but missed the soft section of the door he intended to hit.

Release

Theatrical
Split had its world premiere at Fantastic Fest on September 26, 2016. It also screened at the AFI Fest on November 15, 2016. The film was theatrically released on January 20, 2017, in the United States, United Kingdom and Canada.

Home media
Split was released on Digital HD on April 4, 2017 and on Blu-Ray, DVD, and On-Demand on April 18, 2017, by Universal Pictures Home Entertainment.

Reception

Box office 
Split grossed $138.3 million in the United States and Canada and $140.2 million in other territories, for a worldwide gross of $278.5 million, against a production budget of $9 million. Deadline Hollywood calculated the film made a net profit of $68.2 million, when factoring together all expenses and revenues.

In North America, the film was released alongside the openings of xXx: Return of Xander Cage, The Resurrection of Gavin Stone and The Founder, as well as the wide expansion of 20th Century Women, and was initially expected to gross $20–25 million from 3,038 theaters in its opening weekend. It made $2 million from its Thursday night previews at 2,295 theaters, doubling the $1 million made by Shyamalan's The Visit in 2015, and $14.6 million on its first day, increasing weekend estimates to $30–37 million; it ended up opening to $40.2 million, finishing first at the box office. In its second weekend, the film made $26.3 million, again topping the box office. In its third week, it again topped the box office, this time with $14.6 million, becoming the first Shyamalan film to finish at number one for three straight weeks since The Sixth Sense in 1999.

Critical response 
On review aggregator Rotten Tomatoes, the film has an approval rating of 78% based on 312 reviews, with an average rating of 6.5/10. The website's critical consensus reads: "Split serves as a dramatic tour de force for James McAvoy in multiple roles – and finds writer-director M. Night Shyamalan returning resoundingly to thrilling form." Metacritic reports a weighted average score 62 out of 100, based on 47 critics, indicating "generally favorable reviews." Audiences polled by CinemaScore gave the film an average grade of "B+" on an A+ to F scale, while comScore reported filmgoers gave it a 78% overall positive score and a 54% "definite recommend."

Jordan Hoffman of The Guardian gave the film four stars out of five, stating it to be a "masterful blend of Hitchcock, horror and therapy session". Also writing for The Guardian, Steve Rose had strong praise for McAvoy, opining that the actor "does a fine and fearless job of selling his character's varied personae". He commended McAvoy's ability to switch personalities in one scene toward the end of the film, saying: "It's a little like the T-1000 at the end of Terminator 2. But there are no special effects here, just acting." Christy Lemire, writing for RogerEbert.com, gave the film a score of 3 out of 4 stars, describing it as "an exciting return to form" and "a thrilling reminder of what a technical master [Shyamalan] can be. All his virtuoso camerawork is on display: his lifelong, loving homage to Alfred Hitchcock, which includes, as always, inserting himself in a cameo. And the twist—that there is no Big Twist—is one of the most refreshing parts of all." Kate Muir of The Times gave the film a score of 3 stars out of 5, writing that it "is full of plot holes, but McAvoy’s joyful and menacingly lunatic performance papers over most of them."

David Edelstein of New York magazine was critical of the film, writing: "Shyamalan has returned to what he loves to do: use cheap horror tropes to create his own harebrained mythos", and added: "Though Shyamalan doesn’t use a lot of blood in Split — there’s barely any — his framing sexualizes the torture of the other two teenage girls in a way I found reprehensible. And his depictions of childhood sexual abuse are clinically accurate enough to make anyone with experience of such things feel sick." Anthony Lane of The New Yorker described the film as "an old-fashioned exploitation flick—part of a depleted and degrading genre that not even M. Night Shyamalan, the writer and director of “Split,” can redeem."

The film has been referred to as the first supervillain origin story; the first time a film has been completely devoted to the origins of a villain as opposed to the origins of the superhero. It has also been described as Hollywood's first stealth sequel, with The Hollywood Reporter calling the ending reveal "one of the most shocking surprises in cinematic history".

Reaction from the mental health community 
The film has been poorly received by  mental illness and dissociative identity disorder campaigners. Mental health advocates warn that the film stigmatizes dissociative identity disorder and may directly affect those living with it. "You are going to upset and potentially exacerbate symptoms in thousands of people who are already suffering," psychiatrist Dr. Garrett Marie Deckel, a DID specialist at Mount Sinai's Icahn School of Medicine, said immediately after seeing the film. She said that, in contrast to McAvoy's character, people with DID, who may represent over 1% of Americans, are rarely violent, and research has shown they are far more likely to hurt themselves than to hurt others. Movies tend to portray only "the most extreme aspects" of the disorder, which, she said, can misrepresent a form of mental ill-health that is not well understood by the lay public, and even some psychiatrists.

In a statement about the movie, the International Society for the Study of Trauma and Dissociation (ISSTD) cited a soon-to-be-released study of 173 people with DID. The researchers found that only 3 percent were charged with an offense, 1.8 percent were fined, and less than 1 percent were in jail over a six-month span. No convictions or probations were reported in that time period. In an open letter to Shyamalan, several activists said that "Split represents yet another gross parody of us based on fear, ignorance, and sensationalism, only much worse."

Dr. Sheldon Itzkowitz, a New York-based psychologist and psychoanalyst, said he had not seen the movie, and did not plan to, telling Healthline: "What concerns me is how the film may inadvertently demonize people who are truly suffering." He said many of his patients with DID are highly functioning people whose friends and co-workers don't know how much the person may be affected by their condition. When films and stories "vilify and demonize mental illness in general, and DID in particular," the viewer does not understand how hard it can be for that person to survive, he added.

Accolades

Sequel 

Shyamalan expressed hope for a third installment following Split, saying, "I hope [a third Unbreakable film happens]. The answer is yes. I'm just such a wimp sometimes. I don't know what's going to happen when I go off in my room, a week after this film opens, to write the script. But I'm going to start writing. [I have] a really robust outline, which is pretty intricate. But now the standards for my outlines are higher. I need to know I've won already. I'm almost there but I'm not quite there." He explained that the final scene from Split was David's realization that Mr. Glass from the first film was right; there are superpowered people in the world. Disney, which produced Unbreakable through its Touchstone Pictures division, is expected to be a production partner and have financial participation with Universal for the sequel.

After the critical and financial success of Split, Shyamalan confirmed that his next film would be a sequel film that follows the events of Unbreakable and Split and would serve as the final part of the Unbreakable trilogy. In April 2017, he revealed he was nearing completion on the script for the next film. On April 26, he revealed on his Twitter page that the script was completed and the sequel would be titled Glass, which was released on January 18, 2019.

The cast included the return of Bruce Willis from both previous films, Samuel L. Jackson, Spencer Treat Clark, and Charlayne Woodard from Unbreakable, and James McAvoy and Anya Taylor-Joy from Split, all reprising their roles. Sarah Paulson joined the cast as a new character. It was reported the new film would focus on Dunn (Willis) chasing down Crumb (McAvoy) in his Beast persona, all the while being embroiled in a plot orchestrated by Price (Jackson).

Following a week of rehearsals, principal production commenced on October 2, 2017, in Philadelphia.

References

External links 

 
 
 

2016 horror thriller films
2010s psychological horror films
2010s science fiction thriller films
2016 psychological thriller films
2010s teen horror films
American horror thriller films
American psychological horror films
American psychological thriller films
American psychological drama films
American science fiction thriller films
American teen horror films
Blinding Edge Pictures films
Blumhouse Productions films
American body horror films
Films about cannibalism
Films about kidnapping
Films directed by M. Night Shyamalan
Films produced by M. Night Shyamalan
Films produced by Jason Blum
Films scored by West Dylan Thordson
Films set in Philadelphia
Films set in zoos
Films shot in Philadelphia
American horror drama films
Films with screenplays by M. Night Shyamalan
Supervillain films
Unbreakable (film series)
Universal Pictures films
Films about dissociative identity disorder
Horror crossover films
Film controversies
2010s English-language films
2010s American films